Cuphonotus humistratus is a species of plant in the Brassicaceae family, and was first described in 1878 by Ferdinand von Mueller as Capsella humistrata. It was reassigned to the genus, Cuphonotus, in 1933 by Otto Eugen Schulz.

It is an annual and native to New South Wales, being found on the central and north central western plains.

Description 
It is an annual herb growing to 25 cm tall, and is spreading or erect.  The leaves at the base are up to 3 cm long and shallowly pinnatifid to entire, and do not persist, while leaves on the stem are similar but reduced in size.

References

Taxa named by Ferdinand von Mueller